Peter Tom may refer to:

 Peter Tom (businessman) (born 1940), British businessman;chairman of Leicester Tigers
 Peter Tom (judge), American judge
 Peter Tom (politician) (1964–2018), Solomon Islands politician